Gjon Delhusa (born 9 August 1953) is a Hungarian singer, composer and lyricist, and the cousin of singer Gábor Ihász and footballer Kálmán Ihász. He was the 1996 representative for Hungary in the Eurovision Song Contest 1996.

Early life
Delhusa was born on 9 August 1953, in Budapest. His mother, Erzsébet Ihász, was Gábor and Kálmán Ihász's aunt. His paternal grandparents were Greek and Albanian and his maternal side was mixed German-Hungarian.

Eurovision
In 1996, he was chosen via national final to represent Hungary in the Eurovision Song Contest 1996 in Oslo with the song Fortuna, but was eliminated in the audio-only qualify round. The system was unique, but also had its controversies, as along with Hungary, Germany, one of the main financial contributors to the contest, had also been eliminated. This caused the system to be disposed of after that year.

References

1953 births
20th-century Hungarian male singers
Hungarian people of Albanian descent
Hungarian people of Greek descent
Hungarian people of German descent
Eurovision Song Contest entrants for Hungary
Eurovision Song Contest entrants of 1996
Living people
Musicians from Budapest